Strangers to Ourselves is the sixth album by American alternative rock band Modest Mouse, which was released on March 17, 2015, two weeks after its initially announced release date of March 3. The album was leaked to the internet on March 7, 2015. On March 16, 2015, the day before the album's official release date, Strangers to Ourselves was made available for download on Amazon.com (free for Prime) and the iTunes Store.

It is the band's first studio album since We Were Dead Before the Ship Even Sank, released in 2007, marking the longest gap between studio albums in their career. Modest Mouse recorded two albums' worth of material in their sessions, though the second album still has several songs incomplete.

Joe Zook, who mixed We Were Dead Before the Ship Even Sank, also mixed Strangers To Ourselves.

The album's cover features an aerial image of Venture Out RV Resort, located in Mesa, Arizona.

Singles
The first single from the album, "Lampshades on Fire", was made available on December 15, 2014 for streaming and digital download. Another song from the album, "Coyotes", was made available for download on January 20, 2015. The third song to be made available, "The Best Room", was released on February 3, 2015, alongside the album's track listing. A fourth track from the album, "The Ground Walks, with Time in a Box", was released on February 16, 2015. On March 3, a fifth song from the album was released, the album's final track, "Of Course We Know".

Reception

Strangers to Ourselves received both middling and positive reviews. The album holds a score of 70 out of 100 from Metacritic based on "generally favorable reviews". While some lament the title's lack of experimentation and growth, other reviewers see the album as evidence of the band's evolution. Kyle McGovern of Spin calls the album "a rudderless 15-song set that slightly improves the standing of 2007's middle-of-the-moat We Were Dead Before the Ship Even Sank." Stephen Thomas Erlewine from AllMusic emphasises the strengths of the album's songs individually, but adds that "it's an album where the trees matter more than the forest."

Track listing

Vinyl edition

Personnel

Modest Mouse
Isaac Brock – vocals, guitar, twelve-string, piano, Rhodes, Mellotron, bass, EBow, baritone guitar, Korg MS-20
Jeremiah Green – drums, conga, sequencers, electronic drums, djembe, death whistle, vibes, Korg, kalimba, cigar box guitar, backing vocals
Tom Peloso – bass, synth, Rhodes, piano, upright piano, cornet, kalimba, acoustic guitar, backing vocals
Jim Fairchild – guitar, Rhodes, ukulele, backing vocals
Russell Higbee – bass, Rhodes, upright bass, guitar, pump organ, vibes, electric piano, baritone guitar, euphonium, kalimba, cornet, organ, backing vocals
Lisa Molinaro – viola, cello, bass, vocals
Ben Massarella – percussion
Darrin Wiener – Modular synthesizer, field recordings, machine sequencing

Additional instrumentation
Davey Brozowski – percussion
James Mercer – vocals
Dann Gallucci - drum machine, guitar, acoustic guitar, sequencing, synthesizers
Jose Medeles – drums, percussion, vibes
William Slater – banjo on "The Ground Walks, with Time in a Box", piano, Rhodes, Modular synth, backing vocals
Maureen Pandos – upright bass
Tristan Forney – tuba
Corrina Repp – backing vocals
Jeremy Sherrer – timbales, MPC programming, backing vocals
Tucker Martine – percussion
Seth Lorinczi – bass
Ryan Baldoz – backwards bass

Charts

Weekly charts

Year-end charts

References

External links
 Lampshades on Fire (Streaming Audio)
 Modest Mouse on Myspace

2015 albums
Epic Records albums
Modest Mouse albums